A New Brain is a musical with music and lyrics by William Finn and book by Finn and James Lapine. Though many of Finn's previous musicals are to some extent autobiographical, A New Brain deals directly with his own harrowing experience with an arteriovenous malformation and the healing power of art. The hero of the musical, Gordon Schwinn, worries that he may not live to complete his work. Finn wrote many of the songs soon after his release from the hospital. The musical premiered Off-Broadway in 1998 and has been revived in the U.S., England and elsewhere.

Productions
A New Brain started as a "series of songs that Bill Finn wrote after he left the hospital", with a concert of those songs produced at The Public Theater. A fully staged workshop production was held in 1996 and again in 1997 and included contributions by Lapine.

The musical was first produced Off-Broadway at the Mitzi E. Newhouse Theater at Lincoln Center, with previews beginning on May 14, 1998, and closed on October 11, 1998. The production was directed by Graciela Daniele and featured a cast headed by Malcolm Gets (Gordon Michael Schwinn) and Christopher Innvar (Roger Delli-Bovi), including Michael Mandell (Richard), Penny Fuller (Mimi Schwinn), Mary Testa (Lisa), Kristin Chenoweth (Waitress/Nancy D), Chip Zien (Mr. Bungee), Liz Larsen (Rhoda), John Jellison (Doctor), and Keith Byron Kirk (Minister). Lovette George was an understudy for Rhoda, Waitress, and Nancy D. Christopher Innvar left the show in June 1998 due to vocal problems, and Norm Lewis was to sing the role of Roger on the recording.

A cast recording was made under the RCA Victor label with Norm Lewis singing the role of Roger.

A New Brain was next performed at Rice University during the Sid Richardson Players' 1999–2000 season. It was also done at UC Berkeley BareStage during the 2000–2001 season, which transferred to Shotgun Players in 2001. The show was also produced in March 2002 in St. Louis, Missouri, at New Line Theatre, then premiered in the UK at the Edinburgh Fringe Festival in 2005, with the English premiere in September 2006 in Littlehampton, West Sussex.

The musical was presented as part of the Encores! Off-Center staged concert series June 24–27, 2015 at the New York City Center. The production included multiple rewrites by Finn and Lapine and was directed by Lapine. It starred Jonathan Groff as Gordon and featured Dan Fogler as Mr. Bungee, Ana Gasteyer as Mimi, and Aaron Lazar as Roger.

A new, updated cast recording was recorded by the cast of the Encores! Off-Center production (with the exception of Fogler, who was filming a movie in London at the time of the recording and was replaced by Christian Borle as Mr. Bungee) and was released February 5, 2016, by PS Classics. Unlike the original recording, this two-disc set contains the full show, including over 15 minutes of previously unrecorded music.

Plot
Lisa, a homeless woman, asks the audience for some change. Songwriter Gordon Schwinn works at his piano to meet a deadline, irritated because he must write a song about spring for children's television host Mr. Bungee, who dresses as a frog ("Frogs Have So Much Spring (The Spring Song)"). Gordon takes a break from writing The Spring Song to meet his best friend Rhoda at a restaurant, where the waitress, who is a fan of Mr. Bungee, informs Gordon and Rhoda of the specials at the restaurant, including "Calamari". During lunch, he clutches his head and falls face first into his meal. Rhoda calls an ambulance ("911 Emergency") and Gordon is taken to the hospital. Gordon's greatest fear is dying with his greatest songs still inside him ("I Have so Many Songs"), to which he ponders about what makes a song (“Heart and Music”). Gordon's mother, Mimi, arrives and insists that ("Mother's Gonna Make Things Fine"). A neurosurgeon, Dr. Jafar Berensteiner, explains that there's ("Trouble in His Brain") and that an MRI is necessary.

Gordon snaps at Mimi for underestimating his condition and not listening to the Doctor, to which a hallucination of Mr. Bungee appears, telling Gordon to "Be Polite To Everyone", and Gordon tells it to leave. Gordon daydreams about his boyfriend Roger, who is on his way to the hospital from a "Sailing" trip. The nurses, sadistic Nancy D. and compassionate Richard, are introduced. Nancy D. requests a "Family History", prompting Gordon to ponder why he only inherited the bad traits from his parents ("Gordon's Law of Genetics"). He reflects on his father's abandonment ("And They're Off"). "Roger Arrives" and spends some time with Gordon, who tells him to "Just Go". Richard enters to give Gordon a sponge bath in preparation for his “MRI Tomorrow”. During the sponge bath, Richard complains that he is "Poor, Unsuccessful, and Fat". Gordon hallucinates and sees Mr. Bungee, who continually bullies him. Gordon is visited by a minister, who tries to impose his Protestant beliefs on Gordon, who is Jewish. Gordon asks him to leave, and goes to sleep.

Gordon is woken by Nancy, who informs him that it's “MRI Day”. To cope with his claustrophobia, he thinks about a past sailing trip with Roger ("Sitting Becalmed in the Lee of Cuttyhunk"). Dr. Berensteiner tells Gordon that he has an arteriovenous malformation, and needs a "Craniotomy". Nancy D. informs him of the risks - if he doesn't go through with the operation, he could die, however, if Dr. Berensteiner is not exact with his surgery, he could also die.  Gordon, given the choice by the Doctor, decides to go through with the operation, and Roger offers to sleep with Gordon that night ("An Invitation to Sleep In My Arms"). Rhoda arrives with news that Mr. Bungee needs a new song by the next morning, so Gordon declines Roger's offer and decides to write instead. He then hallucinates about Lisa, who he encountered earlier on his way to lunch with Rhoda. Lisa implores the audience for "Change", both physical money and social change. Gordon presents his new song, "Yes", to Mr. Bungee, who hates it, storming off to leave Gordon dejected "In the Middle of the Room". Mimi cleans Gordon's apartment, and in a rage, throws out all of his books ("Throw It Out"). Gordon waits anxiously as his surgery is delayed ("In the Middle of the Room (Part 2)"). Then the operation commences.

Roger, distraught about the surgery, encounters Lisa, who consoles him ("A Really Lousy Day in the Universe"). In a coma, Gordon hallucinates a surreal mini-opera featuring people from his life ("Brain Dead", "Whenever I Dream", "Eating Myself Up Alive", "The Music Still Plays On"), concluding with a friendly Mr. Bungee telling Gordon “Don’t Give In”, leading him back to consciousness. Dr. Berensteiner celebrates the successful surgery ("Craniotomy (Reprise)"). Gordon and Roger fool around in the hospital shower, much to Richard's dismay ("You Boys Are Gonna Get Me In Such Trouble"). Gordon expresses his new appreciation for life ("Sailing (Reprise)").

Months later, Gordon has recovered and is enjoying a new, more fulfilled life with Roger. They run into Lisa, who is selling Gordon's books that Mimi threw out. Gordon and Roger ask for them back, but she refuses ("The Homeless Lady's Revenge"). She flees, leaving Gordon furious, but Roger calms him down ("Time"). Gordon has apparently overcome his fear of dying with his greatest songs inside him ("Time and Music"). With his life at last in balance, he is able to write again and finishes the spring song ("I Feel so Much Spring").

Character List and Notable Casts

Musical numbers
 "Frogs Have So Much Spring (The Spring Song)" (Gordon)
 "Calamari" (Gordon, Rhoda, Waitress, Mr. Bungee)+
 "911 Emergency / I Have So Many Songs" (Richard, Doctor, Rhoda, Minister, Gordon with Lisa, Waitress)
 "Heart and Music"  (Minister,  Gordon with All but Mr. Bungee)
 “Mother’s Gonna Make Things Fine” (Mimi, Gordon)
 "Trouble in His Brain" (Doctor, Mimi, Rhoda)
 "Be Polite to Everyone" (Mr Bungee)*
 "Sailing"  (Roger, Gordon)
 "Family History" (Nancy D, Richard, Mimi)
 "Gordo's Law of Genetics"  (Nancy D, Doctor, Minister, Rhoda, Richard, Lisa)
 "And They're Off" (Gordon with Nancy D, Doctor, Minister, Rhoda, Richard, Lisa)
 "Roger Arrives" (Gordon, Roger, Mother, Rhoda)*
 "Just Go" (Gordon, Roger)
 ”MRI Tomorrow” (Gordon, Roger, Richard)*
 "Poor, Unsuccessful and Fat" (Richard, Gordon, Mr. Bungee, Minister)
 ”MRI Day” (Gordon, Nancy D)*
 "Sitting Becalmed in the Lee of Cuttyhunk" (All but Mr. Bungee)
 "Craniotomy" (Doctor, Nancy D, Minister, Mimi, Roger, Gordon)*
 "An Invitation to Sleep in My Arms" (Gordon, Roger, Rhoda, Mimi)
 "Change" (Lisa)
 "Yes" (Gordon, Mr. Bungee with Nancy D, Doctor, Minister, Rhoda)
 "In the Middle of the Room" (Gordon, Mimi)
 "Throw It Out" (Mimi)
 ”In the Middle of the Room (Part 2)” (Gordon)*
 "A Really Lousy Day in the Universe" (Roger, Lisa)
 "Brain Dead" (Gordon, Roger)
 "Whenever I Dream" (Rhoda, Gordon)+
 "Eating Myself Up Alive" (Richard with Nancy D, Doctor, Minister, Lisa)+
 "Music Still Plays On" (Mimi)
 "Don't Give In" (Mr. Bungee with Gordon, Roger, Rhoda, Mimi)
 ”Craniotomy (Reprise)” (Doctor)*
 "You Boys Are Gonna Get Me in Such Trouble/Sailing (Reprise)" (Richard, Gordon, Roger)
 "Homeless Lady's Revenge" (Lisa, Gordon, Roger)
 "Time" (Roger and Gordon)
 "Time and Music" (Minister, Gordon with All)
 "I Feel So Much Spring" (Gordon, Lisa, Minister with All)

 *Not included in the Original Cast Recording
 +Not included in the 2015 City Center Revival

Critical reception
Ben Brantley, in his review for The New York Times, wrote: "The problem is that for Mr. Finn (and probably, alas, for most people), happiness is definitely a blander muse than anxiety. A New Brain, which has been directed with wit and elegance by Graciela Daniele, has moments of captivating eccentricity. But watching it is often like passing a group of animated, slightly drunken revelers on the street: you're glad they have something to celebrate, but it's a private party, and you walk on by with a faint smile. Mr. Finn originally conceived what became A New Brain as a series of revue numbers, and it might have worked better in that format. As a story, shaped by Mr. Finn and his longtime collaborator, James Lapine, the show has a spliced-together feeling, a disjunctive quality at odds with the holistic spirit it seems to be aiming for."

Notes

References
A New Brain summary & character descriptions from StageAgent.com
A Curtain up review, June 1998

External links
 Internet Off-Broadway Database listing, 'A New Brain'
Review from NY Theatre
William Finn - Downstage Center interview at American Theatre Wing.org, December 2006
 Littlehampton - England Premiere (August 2006)
 Acting Up Stage - Toronto Premiere (February 2009)
 Pipedream Theatre Project - Vancouver Premiere (June 2009)
  - University of Melbourne Music Theatre Association interview with director, Allie Sutherland (October 2010)
""A New Brain' Plot and songs at guidetomusicaltheatre.com
 - Moonbox at Boston's BCA March 15 - April 6, 2013
- Theater De Lieve Vrouw Amersfoort November 2013 - Februari 2014. Reinier Bavinck, Angelique Severs

1998 musicals
LGBT-related musicals
Musicals by James Lapine
Musicals by William Finn
Musicals inspired by real-life events
Off-Broadway musicals
Sung-through musicals